This is a list of Croatian football supporters' associations. It includes the supporters of clubs in the Croatian league system and those outside Croatia who regularly support the Croatia national team.

Croatia national football team 
Uvijek vjerni

Prva HNL 
Armada - HNK Rijeka
Bad Blue Boys - GNK Dinamo Zagreb
Demoni - NK Istra 1961
Divlje Svinje - NK Inter Zaprešić
Kohorta - NK Osijek
Lokosi - NK Lokomotiva
Plava brigada - NK Slaven Belupo
Šljakeri - HNK Gorica
Torcida - HNK Hajduk Split
White Stones - NK Varaždin (1931–2015)

Other leagues 
Anđeli - NK Međimurje
Blue White Killers - HNK Neretva
Crni Ratnici - NK Hrvatski dragovoljac
Crveni đavoli - RNK Split
Demoni - NK Čakovec
Funcuti - HNK Šibenik
Galantari - NK Imotski
Halub boys - NK Halubjan
Legija - NK Marsonia
Lunatics - NK Vrapče
Malari - HNK Trogir
Olimpijci Županja - NK Graničar
Pešekani - NK Opatija
Red Fuckers - HNK Orijent 1919
Skitnice - NK Nedelišće
Tornado - NK Zadar
Ultras Vinkovci - HNK Cibalia
White Angels - NK Zagreb

Croatian supporters in Bosnia and Herzegovina 
Grdani - NK Brotnjo
Red Warriors - HNK Orašje
Poskoci - HŠK Posušje
Škripari - NK Široki Brijeg
Ultras - HŠK Zrinjski Mostar

Croatian
Supporters
Football supporters